Chilips is a genus of moths belonging to the family Tortricidae.

Species
Chilips claduncus Razowski, 1988

See also
List of Tortricidae genera

References

 , 2005: World Catalogue of Insects vol. 5 Tortricidae.

External links
tortricidae.com

Euliini
Tortricidae genera